Reina Mercedes, officially the Municipality of Reina Mercedes, is a 4th class municipality in the province of Isabela, Philippines. According to the 2020 census, it has a population of 27,900 people.

Etymology
The town was named for Queen Mercedes of Orléans, the first consort of Alfonso XII. She died of tuberculosis on June 26, 1878, in the fourth year of Alfonso's reign. When the town was partitioned from Cauayan on January 20, 1886, the priest Pedro Jiménez named it after the late queen.

Geography

Barangays
Reina Mercedes is politically subdivided into 20 barangays. These barangays are headed by elected officials: Barangay Captain, Barangay Council, whose members are called Barangay Councilors. All are elected every three years.

Climate

Demographics

Economy

Government

Local government
The municipality is governed by a mayor designated as its local chief executive and by a municipal council as its legislative body in accordance with the Local Government Code. The mayor, vice mayor, and the councilors are elected directly by the people through an election which is being held every three years.

Elected officials

Congress representation
Reina Mercedes, belonging to the second legislative district of the province of Isabela, currently represented by Hon. Ed Christopher S. Go.

Education 
The Schools Division of Isabela governs the town's public education system. The division office is a field office of the DepEd in Cagayan Valley region. The office governs the public and private elementary and public and private high schools throughout the municipality.

Elementary schools
 Reina Mercedes Central School (District 2)
 Tallungan Elementary School
 Bliss Elementary School
 Mallalatang Elementary School
 Nappacu Grande-Sinippil Elementary School
 Nappacu Pequeño Elementary School
 Binarsang Elementary School
 Salucong Elementary School
 Santiago Elementary School

High schools
 Reina Mercedes Vocational and Industrial School (Pan-Philippine Highway)
 Reina Mercedes National Highschool (Cutog Pequeno)
 Turod Integrated School
 Banquero Integrated School

References

External links
Municipal Profile at the National Competitiveness Council of the Philippines
Reina Mercedes at the Isabela Government Website
Local Governance Performance Management System
[ Philippine Standard Geographic Code]
Philippine Census Information
Municipality of Reina Mercedes

Municipalities of Isabela (province)
Populated places on the Rio Grande de Cagayan